Stop is a 2015 South Korean-Japanese co-production directed by Kim Ki-duk that had its premiere at the Karlovy Vary International Film Festival in the Czech Republic.

Plot
A young married couple are exposed to radiation during a meltdown at Japan's Fukushima nuclear reactor. The young woman is pregnant and she and her husband must decide whether or not to keep the baby. Their assumption that the child will be disabled is certainly realistic, and they both gradually succumb to madness.

Cast
Natsuko Hori as Miki
Tsubasa Nakae as Sabu
Allen Ai as lunatic pregnant woman
Mitsuhiro Takeda
Daigo Tashiro

References

External links
Stop at the Internet Movie Database
Trailer for Stop

2015 films
2010s pregnancy films
Films directed by Kim Ki-duk
2010s Japanese-language films
Japanese thriller films
South Korean thriller films
Films about autism
Films about nuclear accidents and incidents
Anti-nuclear films
2010s Japanese films
2010s South Korean films